Agim Ajdarević (born 7 May 1969) is a Yugoslav retired footballer.

Club career
He started playing in Serbian lower-league side FK Ozren Sokobanja from where he joined second-level FK Radnički Pirot. Then, he played with Serbian side FK Radnički Niš in the 1988–89 Yugoslav First League, then with Serbian/Kosovar side Liria Prizren in the 1989–90 Yugoslav Second League, then with Serbian side FK Sloboda Užice in the 1990–91 Yugoslav Second League, and finally with Serbian side FK Spartak Subotica in the 1991–92 Yugoslav First League.

In 1992, while on holidays in Sweden, Yugoslav Wars started and Ajdarević family decided to stay. Several Swedish clubs were interested in signing him, but, since he had professional contract with Spartak Subotica, any club would need to pay a transfer-fee. Falkenbergs FF went ahead and Agim Ajdarević in the following years scored 105 goals in 175 games for FFF.

Personal life
According to Albanian press, the family real surname was Hajdari but Agim switched it to "Ajdarević".

His sons, Astrit Ajdarević born in 1990, Arben Ajdarević born in 1995, and Alfred Ajdarević born in 1998, also became footballers.

References

1969 births
Living people
Albanians in Serbia
Yugoslav footballers
Association football forwards
FK Radnički Pirot players
FK Radnički Niš players
KF Liria players
FK Sloboda Užice players
FK Spartak Subotica players
Yugoslav First League players
Falkenbergs FF players
Yugoslav expatriate footballers
Expatriate footballers in Sweden
Yugoslav expatriate sportspeople in Sweden